Sir Jacob Bancks (also Banks, Bankes, Banckes) (1662–1724) was a Swedish naval officer in the British service. He settled in England and became a Tory Member of Parliament.

Early life
His parents were Lawrence Bengston Bancks of Stockholm, commissioner of customs, and his wife Christina. He came to England in 1681 as a diplomat; he was secretary to the Swedish resident of the time in London, who was his uncle. The resident's name, Johan Barckman (Hans Barikman) Leijonberg, is usually Anglicised as James Barkman Leyenburg; it is also given as John Birkman, Count of Lezenburgh.

Naval officer
Bancks joined the Royal Navy in 1681. In 1690 he served at the Battle of Beachy Head, taking over from his wounded captain. Bancks himself had a commission as captain shortly after the battle; he commanded HMS Cambridge in September 1690. In the same year he bought Hall Place, Berkshire.

As captain of HMS Phoenix in 1692, Bancks was off the coast of Spain when he was driven ashore on 12 April by a superior French naval force. The Phoenix was burnt, to prevent its capture. He was captain in HMS Carlisle in 1693. He was on half pay from 1696, or from the conclusion of the Treaty of Ryswick (end 1697). He was knighted in 1698, as captain of HMS Russell, which he had commanded since 1696.

In politics
He married the widow Mary Luttrell (née Tregonwell) in 1696, and represented Minehead as Member of Parliament from 1698, initially with Alexander Luttrell, brother of Francis, his wife's first husband. He was subsequently involved in the rougher side of the Whig-Tory factional strife.

Bancks had George Rooke as stepson for a short period, since Rooke's second wife was Mary Luttrell (died 1702), daughter of his wife by her first marriage. Bancks, Rooke and some others belonged to a gentleman's club, for which commemorative medals were struck in 1703 by the visiting Swedish medallist, Bengt Richter; another member who was an M.P. was Tanfield Vachell. A legal case resulted from the connection. After a quarrel with Rooke, William Colepeper claimed that an attempt, on behalf of Rooke, was made upon his life. He had been assaulted at Windsor Castle in July 1703, by Bancks in particular, on the occasion of Colepeper's delivering a petition for Daniel Defoe who was imprisoned. After a trial before Lord-justice Sir John Holt, 14 February 1704, some persons associated with Rooke were fined for attempts to do Colepeper injury: Nathaniel Denew, John Merriam and Robert Britton. Later in 1704 Bancks was allowed the assistance of Sir Simon Harcourt the Solicitor-General to prepare against a case brought by Colepeper.

In 1711 Bancks was attacked in an open letter, initially published anonymously, by the Whig publicist William Benson. It was provoked by an address the year before by Bancks to the borough, commending the doctrine of passive obedience over Whig resistance theory. Benson aimed to associate the "Minehead doctrine" he attributed to Bancks with the absolutism of Charles XII of Sweden. He followed it with another such letter. In 1713 Benson and James Milner of London stood against Bancks and Sir John Trevelyan, 2nd Baronet in Minehead. The Tory pair won the borough, but Bancks did not stand again.

Jacobite
Bancks was implicated in the "Gyllenberg Plot", a Jacobite conspiracy in 1716–7 set up by Carl Gyllenborg and Georg Heinrich von Görtz. He was taken into custody, with Charles Caesar, on 29 January 1717, the day on which General George Wade implicated Gyllenborg in plotting by finding incriminating papers. Another arrest was Boyle Smith. Bancks and Caesar had in fact raised and sent to Sweden £18,000 to support a putative Jacobite invasion; but there was little intention in Sweden of spending it for that purpose.

Legacy

Around 1715 he commissioned Francis Bird to sculpt a statue of Queen Anne for Minehead.

Family
Jacob Bancks (1704–1738), also a Member of Parliament, was his son. When the younger Jacob Bancks died intestate, a complex lawsuit arose, involving the Swedish side of the family.

Notes

External links
1703 medal commemorating Bancks, Royal Museums Greenwich
 Family tree

1662 births
1724 deaths
Swedish military officers
Royal Navy officers
Members of the Parliament of Great Britain for English constituencies
Swedish diplomats
English MPs 1698–1700
17th-century Royal Navy personnel
English MPs 1701
English MPs 1701–1702
English MPs 1702–1705
English MPs 1705–1707
British MPs 1707–1708
British MPs 1708–1710
British MPs 1710–1713
British MPs 1713–1715
Swedish emigrants to the Kingdom of England
Military personnel from Stockholm